TESA Collective (Toolbox for Education and Social Action) is a worker-owned co-op that designs games and tools for social justice organizations. TESA consciously engages in ethical, social change practices that intend to create healthier communities.

Social change games 
Creating and publishing games that address issues of social and economic change is a growing trend. TESA develops projects ranging from board games, to documentaries, to interactive webinars. In cooperative games, everyone wins or everyone loses.

Games 
Co-opoly is a board game that teaches players the ins and outs of negotiating a Cooperative business.

In Rise Up: The Game of People and Power, players build a social movement and take on an oppressive system.

Space Cats Fight Fascism is the fourth in a series of social justice games from  the TESA Collective.

TESA Collective and Jobs with Justice funded a labor organizing game on Kickstarter. In STRIKE!: The Game of Worker Rebellion, players grow their ranks, mobilize workers, and organize strikes around their city. The campaign for the game ran during a union drive at Kickstarter.

See also 
 Games for Change

References

External links 
 Official website

Worker cooperatives of the United States
Card game publishing companies
Board game publishing companies
Social justice board games